Paul Fusco is an American puppeteer, actor, television producer, writer and director. He is best known as the puppeteer and voice of the title character on the sitcom ALF, for which he also served as creator, writer, producer, and director. He formed the production company Alien Productions with Tom Patchett and Bernie Brillstein.

Career

As a student, Paul Fusco worked in the audio-visual department of Hamden High School in Hamden, Connecticut, where his interest in television and film began. His early career included a stint performing on a local children's television show and various other work that included both puppeteering and stage magic/ventriloquism. In the early 1980s, he met puppet builders and fellow puppeteers Bob Fappiano and Lisa Buckley who were both embarking on careers within the industry and they joined his team. Together they made various television specials for HBO, Showtime and others including The Crown of Bogg and The Valentine's Day That Almost Wasn't.

ALF

Fusco created the ALF character in 1984 using an "alien"-looking puppet that he had in his house, which he used to annoy his family and friends. He wanted to create a television show based on the character. Through Bernie Brillstein he met Tom Patchett, and together they came up with the concept behind the ALF sitcom. They pitched the idea to NBC's Brandon Tartikoff, who loved the idea and commissioned the show. ALF was a success, beginning in 1986 and lasting four seasons, during which 99 episodes were produced.

Fusco also created and produced two animated series for NBC: ALF: The Animated Series and ALF Tales. A co-production of DIC, Alien Productions, Lorimar-Telepictures, and Saban Entertainment, the cartoons portrayed Gordon Shumway (ALF) and his family in their days on Melmac prior to the planet explosion. Animated segments were hosted by the live-action ALF, who read letters from viewers and told stories about life back home. Space Cats, a Paul Fusco-produced show in association with Marvel Productions, also ran on NBC in the early 1990s, which was another mix of live action puppetry and animation. The episodes would begin with the live action puppetry where Captain Catgut (voiced by Fusco), the leader of the Spacecats, would receive a mission briefing about the trouble at hand. Space Cats lasted one season and produced 13 episodes, being cancelled after NBC withdrew its commitment to Saturday morning cartoons.

NBC unexpectedly cancelled ALF in 1990 after production wrapped for Season Four, leaving the final episode ("Consider Me Gone") as an unresolved cliffhanger. ABC offered Fusco closure to the story arc and produced a television movie in 1996 called Project ALF co-starring Martin Sheen. The movie (produced by Paul Fusco Productions) saw ALF escaping from the military base where he had been held for testing, but the scientist who he thinks will help him is really plotting to expose his existence to the world on a television talk show.

Fusco kept ALF in the public eye as much as possible after Project ALF. Between 1996 and 2001, ALF made many television guest appearances including The Cindy Margolis Show, Talk Soup, and Love Boat: The Next Wave. Fusco continued the trend by featuring ALF on NBC's 75th Anniversary Show and the 2003 TV Land Awards. During 2003–04, he revived his guest spot on Hollywood Squares, and also became the "spokesalien" for phone company 10-10-220. ALF merchandise also returned with posters, figures and T-shirts. The U.S.-Canadian DVD release of the original sitcom was the recipient of much critical and fan backlash due to distributor Lionsgate Home Entertainment's insistence on utilizing syndicated/edited versions instead of remastering the original uncut NBC-TV broadcast versions, resulting in poor sales. The German DVD release included complete episodes for all but three of the 99 entries. 

The ALF renaissance led to ALF's Hit Talk Show in 2004, created and produced by Fusco for TV Land. The show was a mix of celebrity chat and skits filmed in front of a live audience from Hollywood's Sunset Boulevard and lasted only eight episodes.

In November 2007, ALF appeared as "TV Icon of the Week" on The O'Reilly Factor. In 2016 ALF made appearances on two different television series, Mr. Robot and Young Sheldon, one episode of each.

In August 2012, Fusco confirmed that Sony Pictures Animation had acquired the rights to ALF and would develop the property into a CGI-live action hybrid feature. The Smurfs producer Jordan Kerner would also produce the film, along with Tom Patchett and Fusco.

Personal life
Paul Fusco lives with his wife Linda and son Christopher.

Filmography

References

External links

Living people
American male voice actors
American male film actors
American male television actors
American puppeteers
Male actors from New Haven, Connecticut
Year of birth missing (living people)